Khaneqah (also Romanized as Khāneqāh and Khānqāh; also known as Khānīyeh) is a village in Churs Rural District, in the Central District of Chaypareh County, West Azerbaijan Province, Iran. At the 2006 census, its population was 792, in 167 families.

References 

Populated places in Chaypareh County